AMK may refer to:

AMK (band), an indie rock band from Hong Kong
 AMK, a Turkish sports newspaper published by the Sözcü group
AMK Baru, a political coalition in Malaysia
AMK Ranch, a guest ranch in Wyoming
Ammattikorkeakoulu, a type of university in Finland
Ang Mo Kio, a town in Singapore
AMK Hub, a suburban shopping mall in Ang Mo Kio
Ang Mo Kio MRT station (MRT station abbreviation), a mass rapid transit station in Ang Mo Kio
Angkor Mikroheranhvatho Kampuchea, a microfinance company in Cambodia
Antimisting kerosene, an experimental aviation jet fuel
Anthony McLeod Kennedy (born 1936), former US Supreme Court justice